Murgitroyd is an international practice of intellectual property attorneys, headquartered in Glasgow, which specialises in patents, trade marks, designs and copyrights. The practice was established in 1975 and currently has 24 offices worldwide, and over 440 employees.

History 
Murgitroyd was founded as a sole practitioner practice in Glasgow, Scotland by Ian Murgitroyd in 1975. The practice became a partnership in 1977 and was incorporated in 1993. It is currently a standalone private limited company ultimately owned by Sovereign Capital.  Prior to its acquisition by Sovereign Capital in 2019, the Murgitroyd group was listed on the Alternative Investment Market of the London Stock Exchange, having floated in 2001.

Acquisitions 
Murgitroyd has acquired a number of practices since the turn of the century:

 2003: Cabinet Bonneau based in Nice, France
 2005: Castles based in London, England
 2006: Fitzpatricks based in Glasgow 
 2008: Kennedys based in Glasgow, Scotland and Newcastle upon Tyne, England
 2009: Raworth Moss & Cook based in London, England 
 2013: Patentanwalt Liu based in Munich, Germany
 2016: Patentvest based in Managua, Nicaragua
 2019: Chapman IP based in Southampton, England 
 2021: Hanna Moore + Curley, based in Dublin, Ireland, and Dalian, China.
 2021: UDL Intellectual Property, based in Leeds, Cardiff, London, Milton Keynes, and Newcastle, England. 
 2022: Creation IP, based in Glasgow, Scotland.

Most recently, the UK-based IP firm TLIP, based in Leeds and Cambridge, England' joined Murgitroyd in December 2022.

Offices 
Murgitroyd has twenty offices in Europe — in the United Kingdom, Finland, France, Germany, Ireland, Italy and Switzerland — and direct representation rights in Austria, Belgium, Denmark, Luxembourg, Monaco, The Netherlands, Norway and Sweden. Furthermore, the practice also has two client liaison offices in the United States of America, an office in Dalian, China and a further office in Nicaragua specialising in patent searching, technical illustration and docketing.

 Aberdeen
 Belfast
 Bristol
 Cambridge
 Cardiff
 Dalian, China
 Dublin
 Dublin - CBD
 Durham, North Carolina
 Geneva
 Glasgow (headquarters)
 Helsinki
 Leeds
 London Croydon
 London Central
 Milan
 Milton Keynes
 Munich
 Newcastle upon Tyne
 Managua, Nicaragua
 Nice
 Santa Clara
 Southampton
 York

Industry rankings 
Murgitroyd was awarded the highest ranking across all sector categories in the Financial Times 2019 Survey of Europe's Leading Patent Law Firms.

Murgitroyd was also ranked in the top tier of the Managing Intellectual Property IPStars 2016 guide in Scotland, features in The Legal 500 (UK) directory and the Chambers & Partners directory, and has also gained ISO 9000 accreditation and a gold status ranking from the Intellectual Asset Management Patent 1000.

References

External links 
 Official site
 Legal 500 Directory
 Managing Intellectual Property IP Stars

Intellectual property law firms
Companies based in Glasgow